Milan Barteska (born 17 June 1973) is a Czech football midfielder. He made over 250 appearances in the Gambrinus liga. He also played international football at under-21 level for Czech Republic U21.

Barteska announced his retirement from football in January 2011, having played 270 matches at the top level in the Czech Republic.

References

External links
 
 

1973 births
Living people
Czech footballers
Czech Republic under-21 international footballers
Czech First League players
FK Jablonec players
FC Viktoria Plzeň players
1. FK Příbram players
FK Viktoria Žižkov players
SFC Opava players
FC Silon Táborsko players
Association football midfielders